Kurtz or Kurz is a surname first found in Switzerland. It is mainly a German and Jewish (Ashkenazic/Yiddish) surname, meaning someone who is short in height. It comes from the German word 'kurz' meaning 'short'.

Notable people of this name 
 Kurz ibn Jabir al-Fihri (628 AD), a companion of Muhammad
 Jacob Kurz von Senftenau (or Latin: Jacob Curtius; Czech: Jakub Kurz ze Senftenavy), Imperial pro-chancellor for Rudolph II
 Adolf Kurz (1888–1959), German wrestler
 Christoph Albert Kurz (1806-1864), Swiss politician who served as the third mayor of Bern
 Bastian Kurz (born 1996), German football midfielder
 Bob Kurtz (animator), director, producer, artist, and designer, primarily in film and TV commercials
 Bob Kurtz (broadcaster), American sportscaster
 Bruno Kurz (born 1957), German painter
 Craven Kurz, American Orthodontist, inventor of Lingual braces
 David B. Kurtz (1819–1898), American politician in California
 Dayna Kurtz, American singer/songwriter
 Diana Kurz (born 1936), Austrian-born feminist painter
 Edmund Kurtz (1908–2004), Russian-born Australian cellist and music editor
 Efrem Kurtz (1900–1995), conductor
 Erwin Kurz (1846–1901), President of the Swiss National Council (1887/1888)
 Eugene Kurtz (1923–2006), American composer
 Frank Kurtz (1911–1996), diver and aviator
 Frank Kurtz (director), American film director and comics writer
 Fred Kurz (1918–1978), English football player
 Gary Kurtz, American film producer (Star Wars)
 Gerdina Hendrika Kurtz (1899–1989), Dutch historian, writer and archivist
 Glenn Kurtz (born 1962), American writer
 George Kurtz American cybersecurity entrepreneur 
 Hal Kurtz (born 1943), baseball player
 Heinrich Kurz (died 1557), Roman Catholic Auxiliary Bishop of Passau 
 Heinz D. Kurz (born 1946), Austrian professor of economics 
 Hermann Kurz (1813–1873), German poet and novelist
 Howard Kurtz (born 1953), American journalist, author and media critic
 Ilona Kurz (1899-1975), Czech concert pianist and professor
 Irma Kurtz (born 1935), American-born UK-based agony aunt 
 Isolde Kurz (1853–1944), German poet and short story writer
 Jacob Banks Kurtz (1867–1960), US Congressman from Pennsylvania
 Jerry Kurz (born 1949), one of the earliest leaders of Arena football
 Johann Kurz (19131-985), Roman Catholic Presbyter and schoolmaster of the Archbishop seminary Hollabrun
 Johann Heinrich Kurtz (1809–1890), German Lutheran theologian
 Joseph Edward Kurtz (born 1946), Roman Catholic Archbishop of Louisville, Kentucky
 Josef Kurz, or Josef Kruz (1889-?), Czech sports shooter
 Joseph Kurtz (born 1964), engineer and builder 
 Joyce Kurtz (born 1958), American voice actress
 Justin Kurtz (born 1977), Canadian ice hockey player
 Karl Friedrich Kurz (1878–1962), Swiss-German-Norwegian novelist
 Katherine Kurtz (born 1944), fantasy author
 Kurt Kurz (1927–2013), Austrian ice hockey player
 Lucy Kurtz (1861–1937), wife of Douglas Hyde, 1st President of Ireland
 Marco Kurz (born 1969), German footballer
 Maxine Kurtz (1921-2009), American city planner
 Michael L. Kurtz (born 1941), American historian
 Mike Kurtz (c. 1845–1904), American burglar and gang leader in New York City
 Nico Kurz (born 1997), German darts player 
 Oliver Kurtz (born 1971), German hockey player
 Otto Kurz (1908-1975), Austrian historian
 Robert Kurz (born 1985), American basketball player
 Paul Kurtz (1925–2012), American philosopher and skeptic
 Robert Kurz (philosopher) (1943–2012), German Marxist, social critic and editor of the journal Exit!
Rosemary Kurtz (born 1930), American educator and politician
 Rudolf Friedrich Kurz (1818–1871), Swiss painter of native Americans
 Sarah Kurtz, American solar cell researcher
 Stanley Kurtz, contributing editor for National Review Online
Samuel Kurtz, Welsh politician
 Sanne Kurz (born 1974), German cinematographer
 Scott Kurtz, author of the webcomic Player Vs. Player
 Selma Kurz (1874–1933), Austrian operatic soprano
 Stephen G. Kurtz, American historian
 Steve Kurtz, performance artist
 Swoosie Kurtz (born 1944), American actress, daughter of Frank 
 Thomas Kurz (born 1988), German football player
 Thomas Eugene Kurtz (born 1928), computer scientist, co-developed the BASIC programming language
 Toni Kurz (1913–1936), German mountain climber 
 Vilém Kurz (1872–1945), Czech pianist and renowned piano teacher
 Werner Kurz, Canadian researcher on climate change accountability
 Wilhelm Sulpiz Kurz (1834–1878), German botanist and garden director
 William Kurtz (photographer) (1833–1904), German-American photographer based in New York City
 William Henry Kurtz (1804–1868), US Congressman from Pennsylvania
 William Joseph Kurtz (1935-2023), Polish Roman Catholic prelate

In fiction

 Kurtz (Heart of Darkness), novel character
 Colonel Kurtz, film character, from Apocalypse Now

References

German-language surnames
Jewish surnames